The 2017 Australian Handball League is the second season round robin handball league in Australia. The principal idea was to play round robin games in each capital city. There are four teams representing four states.

Calendar

Franchises

Results

Table

Round 1 – Geelong (Victoria)

Round 2 – Gold Coast (Queensland)

Round 3 – Canberra (ACT)
Cancelled

Finals - Sydney

Semi-finals

Bronze Medal match

Gold Medal match

Final standings

References

 Round 1 results
 Wolves season review

External links
 Official webpage
 Handball Australia webpage

Handball
Australian Handball League
2017
Australia